Jonas Björkman and John-Laffnie de Jager were the defending champions but did not compete that year.

Jacco Eltingh and Paul Haarhuis won in the final 6–3, 7–5 against Olivier Delaître and Guillaume Raoux.

Seeds
Champion seeds are indicated in bold text while text in italics indicates the round in which those seeds were eliminated.

 Jacco Eltingh /  Paul Haarhuis (champions)
 Patrick Galbraith /  Alex O'Brien (first round)
 Donald Johnson /  Francisco Montana (semifinals)
 David Adams /  Hendrik Jan Davids (semifinals)

Draw

References
 1996 Grand Prix de Tennis de Toulouse Doubles Draw

1996 Doubles
1996 ATP Tour